Britholite-(Ce) is a rare radioactive mineral with the chemical formula . It comes in a variety of different colors. Its type locality is Naujakasik (Naajakasik), Tunulliarfik Fjord, Ilímaussaq complex, Narsaq, Kujalleq, Greenland.

Discovery 
The mineral was first discovered by Gustaf Flink in 1897 inside a nepheline-syenite at Naujakasik, Ilímaussaq complex, Greenland. It was named after the Greek word  which means "weight" referring to its high specific gravity, it was later named britholite-(Ce) due to the high amounts of cerium in its composition.

References

External links
"Britholite-(Ce) Mineral Data".

Minerals
Hexagonal minerals
Minerals in space group 176
Radioactive minerals
Silicate minerals